Tullio "Tullo" Pandolfini (6 August 1914 – 23 April 1999) was an Italian water polo player who competed in the 1948 Summer Olympics.

He was born and died in Florence.

Pandolfini was part of the Italian team which won the gold medal. He played two matches.

His younger brother Gianfranco was also a member of the team and played five matches.

See also
 Italy men's Olympic water polo team records and statistics
 List of Olympic champions in men's water polo
 List of Olympic medalists in water polo (men)

External links
 

1914 births
1999 deaths
Sportspeople from Florence
Italian male water polo players
Water polo players at the 1948 Summer Olympics
Olympic gold medalists for Italy in water polo
Medalists at the 1948 Summer Olympics
20th-century Italian people